The Gun That Won the West is a 1955 American Western film directed by William Castle and starring Dennis Morgan, Paula Raymond and Richard Denning.

Plot
Colonel Carrington (Roy Gordon) and his command are assigned the job of constructing a chain of forts in the Sioux Indian territory of Wyoming during the 1880s. The Colonel recruits former cavalry soldiers turned frontier scouts Jim Bridger (Dennis Morgan) and "Dakota Jack" Gaines (Richard Denning), now running a Wild West show, to head the fort building.

Bridger and Gaines are friendly with Sioux chief Red Cloud (Robert Bice) but have reservations about the chief's 2nd in command, Afraid of Horses (Michael Morgan). Both Bridger and Gaines are confident a peace treaty with the Sioux can be made. However, if war breaks out, the cavalry is depending on getting a new type of breech loading Springfield Model 1865 rifle. Gaines, Mrs. Gaines (Paula Raymond), and Bridger arrive at the fort for the conference. Gaines gets drunk and attempts to intimidate the Indians into signing a treaty. Chief Red Fox threatens war if his territory is invaded by any troops building forts.

Cast
 Dennis Morgan as Jim Bridger
 Paula Raymond as Mrs. Max Gaines
 Richard Denning as 'Dakota' Jack Gaines
 Chris O'Brien as Sgt. Timothy Carnahan
 Robert Bice as Chief Red Cloud
 Michael Morgan as Afraid of Horses
 Roy Gordon as Colonel Carrington
 Howard Wright as General Pope
Richard Travis as Lang - Rifle Demonstrator (uncredited) 
 Richard H. Cutting as Edwin M. Stanton (uncredited) 
 Don C. Harvey as Doctor (uncredited)

Production
The film features a large amount of stock footage from Buffalo Bill.

See also
 List of American films of 1955
Colt .45
Winchester '73
Springfield Rifle

References

External links
 
 
 
 
Review of film at Variety

1955 films
1955 Western (genre) films
Films set in the 1880s
Films directed by William Castle
Columbia Pictures films
American Western (genre) films
1950s English-language films
1950s American films